A Tamar barge is a masted sailing vessel, designed for carrying cargo along the River Tamar and the south coast of Cornwall.

The Tamar barge can be either a single or double masted vessel. It can carry up to 32 tonnes. Tamar barges were manufactured in the 19th century in the Tamar Valley by boatbuilders such as James Goss of Calstock, Frederick Hawke of Stonehouse, Plymouth and David Banks of Queen Anne’s Battery in Sutton Harbour, Plymouth.

There are only two surviving Tamar barges, both have been almost completely restored. Normally one, Shamrock, is open to visitors at Cotehele Quay and the other, Lynher, is privately owned and moored at Cremyll.

Shamrock is currently undergoing extensive repairs due to lack of maintenance which had led to mould and rot spreading throughout the timbers. The National Trust has launched a fundraising campaign to pay for the repairs to the historic vessel.

List of known Tamar Barges

Surviving Tamar barges 
 Shamrock, built in 1899 by Frederick Hawke.
 Lynher, built in 1896 by James Goss. Ship of the National Historic Fleet

See also 

 West Country Ketch
 Cotehele House

References

Further reading
"Meet Shaune Blight" National Trust Magazine; summer 2019, p. 82 ("Shamrock, the last working ketch-rigged Tamar sailing barge to be built ... [he] is responsible for keeping the 120-year-old boat afloat")
"Lord John Roberts; Site Report" Forgotten Wrecks of the First World War (2018)

External links 
 Calstock History
 National Trust Cotehele Quay
Shamrock, Cotehele

Ship types
Barges
Cargo ships
Sailboat types